Pluralism denotes a diversity of views or stands rather than a single approach or method.

Pluralism or pluralist may refer to:

Politics and law 
 Pluralism (political philosophy), the acknowledgement of a diversity of political systems
 Pluralism (political theory), belief that there should be diverse and competing centres of power in society
 Legal pluralism, the existence of differing legal systems in a population or area
 Pluralist democracy, a political system with more than one center of power

Philosophy 
 Pluralism (philosophy), a doctrine according to which many basic substances make up reality
 Pluralist school, a Greek school of pre-Socratic philosophers
 Epistemological pluralism or methodological pluralism, the view that some phenomena require multiple methods to account for their nature
 Value pluralism, the idea that several values may be equally correct and yet in conflict with each other

Religion 
 Religious pluralism, the acceptance of all religious paths as equally valid, promoting coexistence
 Holding multiple ecclesiastical offices; see "Pluralism" at Benefice
 Pluralism Project, a Harvard-affiliated project on religious diversity in the United States

Other uses 
 Cosmic pluralism, the belief in numerous other worlds beyond the Earth, which may possess the conditions suitable for life
 Cultural pluralism, when small groups within a larger society maintain their unique cultural identities
 Media pluralism, the representation of different cultural groups and political opinions in the media
 Pluralist commonwealth, a systemic model of wealth democratization
 Pluralism in economics, a campaign to enrich the academic discipline of economics

See also 
 Plurality (disambiguation)
 Journal of Legal Pluralism, a peer-reviewed academic journal that focuses on legal pluralism
 Global Centre for Pluralism, an international centre for research of pluralist societies
 Multiculturalism, the existence of multiple cultural traditions within a single country
 Postmodernism, a broad movement in the late-20th century skeptical toward grand narratives or ideologies